Higganum Landing Historic District is a historic district in Haddam, Connecticut. It was listed on the National Register of Historic Places on December 10, 2018. It is located within a larger, 50-acre historic district that was listed on the Connecticut State Register of Historic Places on March 25, 1987.

Currently a residential neighborhood, Higganum Landing was a successful trading port and shipbuilding center between 1760 and 1870. The gentle bend of the Connecticut River created a natural harbor where more than 150 vessels were constructed. The district is architecturally significant because of its nine historic houses, built in the Cape Cod, Georgian, and Federal styles during the late 1700s through the mid-1800s.

See also 

 Haddam Center Historic District
 James Hazelton House in Haddam
 National Register of Historic Places listings in Middlesex County, Connecticut

References 

Haddam, Connecticut
Colonial architecture in Connecticut
Historic districts in Middlesex County, Connecticut
National Register of Historic Places in Middlesex County, Connecticut
Historic districts on the National Register of Historic Places in Connecticut